Pompa is a commune in Făleşti District, Moldova. It is composed of three villages: Pervomaisc, Pompa and Suvorovca.

References

Communes of Fălești District